Buddy the Gee Man is a 1935 Warner Bros. Looney Tunes cartoon, directed by Jack King. The short was released on August 24, 1935, and stars Buddy, the second star of the series.

The short is the last cartoon to feature Buddy, the sole star of the Looney Tunes series since September 1933's Buddy's Day Out. The next film in the series, A Cartoonist's Nightmare, features Beans the Cat. The theme music is "Lulu's Back In Town".

Summary
In Washington, D.C., at the Department of Justice, an agent rushes a letter off to Federal Agent Buddy at 000 1/2 Cornbread Avenue in Kansas City, Missouri. In Kansas City, Our Hero opens the letter and reads his order: "Conduct secret investigation as to the treatment accorded prisoners by Warden at Sing-Song Prison." Donning a false mustache and his cap, Buddy spits on a horseshoe and tosses it behind him, flipping his lid upon seeing that he has broken a mirror. Shrugging it off, he starts out the door. Gathering his dog, which is dressed like Sherlock Holmes, Buddy goes off to the police station. From the station, two officers are taking Machinegun Mike to Sing-Song. There is a great commotion amongst a gathered throng. Buddy and his dog latch themselves onto the back of the police car.

A troupe of motorcycles precedes the car as it rolls past the gates of the prison. Buddy opens the door of the office of Warden Otto B. Kinder, on whom he spies, taking notes continually. When the prisoners break into a musical number ("Lulu's Back in Town," again), the Warden orders them to be silent. The Warden also orders silence from two prisoners exchanging letters. He gives a mallet to a lazy prisoner supposed to be smashing rocks, instead tapping out "London Bridge Is Falling Down", only to be accidentally smacked in the head by the mallet. Another prisoner is attempting to propel himself from the prison by means of a cannon, but is given a pick-axe.

Buddy rushes off to a typewriter and begins a letter to his Chief in Washington: "Inspection completed. Recommend change in warden. Have some new ideas how prison should be run." A newspaper then reveals to us that Our Hero has been chosen warden! The prisoners now are shown to be enjoying some of their time at the prison; Warden Buddy doles out ice cream and offers cigars to his subjects. Machinegun Mike is given a notice of pardon by a guard, but sets it aflame with his cigar. He instead continuing working on a rock with his jackhammer. Prisoners rush through the gates now, pleasantly excited that Buddy is warden. But some must be shut out, because, as a sign hung over the gate by the new warden states, there are "no vacancies."

Buddy's address
Buddy lives at 000 1/2 Cornbread Avenue, just as Cookie is shown to live at 00 1/2 Cornbread Avenue in Buddy the Detective. Another similarity between this cartoon and Buddy the Detective is the use of Holmesian garb, although here it is worn by the dog rather than the protagonist.

That's All Folks!
This is the fourth and last Buddy cartoon after which Beans the Cat delivers the traditional Looney Tunes valediction, "That's all, folks!" For more on this, see the relevant section of the article on Buddy's Bug Hunt.

Home media
An unrestored Buddy the Gee Man was included on the DVD release of the Warner Bros. film G Men, starring James Cagney.

References

External links
 

1935 films
1935 animated films
American black-and-white films
Films scored by Norman Spencer (composer)
Films directed by Jack King
Buddy (Looney Tunes) films
Films set in Kansas City, Missouri
Films set in prison
Films set in Washington, D.C.
Looney Tunes shorts
Warner Bros. Cartoons animated short films
1930s Warner Bros. animated short films